Witold Rowicki (born Witold Kałka, 26 February 1914 in Taganrog, Russian Empire – 1 October 1989 in Warsaw) was a Polish conductor.  He held principal conducting positions with the Warsaw Philharmonic Orchestra and the Bamberg Symphony Orchestra. Witold Lutoslawski's Concerto for Orchestra was dedicated to him.

Biography
Rowicki arrived in Poland in 1923, attending schools in Żywiec and Nowy Sącz before matriculating at the conservatory in Kraków. He studied violin under Artur Malawski and theory under director Michał Piotrowski and made his conducting debut, while still a student, in 1933. Graduating in 1938, he was appointed professor of violin at the conservatory and spent the occupation years in Kraków. After the Soviet expulsion of the Nazis from Poland, Rowicki revived the defunct Polish National Radio Symphony Orchestra, which had disbanded during the war, in Katowice. Between 1950 and 1955, and again between 1958 and 1977, Rowicki was the director of the Warsaw Philharmonic, leading the orchestra on multiple foreign tours and receiving several decorations from the Polish government. He later moved to West Germany and directed the Bamberg Symphony from 1983 to 1985.

Discography
Rowicki was most strongly associated with the Warsaw Philharmonic, but he also made recordings as a guest conductor with orchestras including the London Symphony Orchestra, the Philharmonia Orchestra, and the Royal Philharmonic Orchestra (all in London), the Yomiuri Nippon Symphony Orchestra in Tokyo, and the Wiener Symphoniker. His recordings include:
 a Dvořák symphony cycle with the London Symphony Orchestra,
 works of Wojciech Kilar
 the Violin Concerto, Eternal Songs and Lithuanian Rhapsody of Mieczysław Karłowicz
 various works of Karol Szymanowski.
 Schumann and Prokofiev piano concertos with Sviatoslav Richter; Mozart piano concertos with Ingrid Haebler and the London Symphony Orchestra

References

External links
 Biography (in Polish)
 Obituary

1914 births
1989 deaths
People from Nowy Sącz
Polish conductors (music)
Male conductors (music)
Burials at Powązki Cemetery
20th-century conductors (music)
20th-century male musicians
Recipients of the State Award Badge (Poland)